The El Paso Zoo is a zoo located in El Paso, Texas. The  facility houses animals representing over 220 species, including such critically endangered species as the Amur leopard and the Aruba rattlesnake. The zoo is home to a sea lion exhibit, which hosts daily shows, as well as exotic animals from around the world with feature attractions such as the African Star train and the Hunt Family Desert Spring. The zoo recently expanded in size with the addition on the new African Exhibit featuring lions, zebras, and giraffes.

The El Paso Zoo is an accredited member of the Association of Zoos and Aquariums (AZA).

Zoo sections 
The El Paso Zoo contains animals in four major areas - Animals of Africa, Animals of Asia, Animals of the Americas, and Animals of the Chihuahuan Desert.

Animals of Africa 
The Animals of Africa section was opened in March 2010 with African lion and meerkat exhibits. In November 2010, it was further expanded with eight new antelope species, including kudu and Thomson's gazelles. The Animals of Africa section also includes Red River hog, giraffe, zebra, grey crowned crane, Cape teal, Egyptian geese, spur-winged geese, and radiated tortoises.

Animals of Asia 
The Animals of Asia section highlights animals of that continent, including Asian elephant, Sumatran orangutans, Malayan tapirs, Siamang gibbons, lion-tailed macaques, Malayan tigers, Malayan sun bears, and Przewalski's horses. The indoor Asian Forest Complex is home to small mammals like the Prevost's squirrel and slow loris, as well as birds including hooded cranes, pink pigeons, rhinoceros hornbill, white-eyed ducks, Bali myna, black-naped fruit dove, bleeding heart pigeon, Nicobar pigeon, and yellow-vented bulbuls. The building is also home to a Burmese python and goldfish.

Animals of the Americas 
The Animals of the Americas section contains exhibits of a variety of animals from the Americas including a sea lion program,  the South American Pavilion, and a spider monkey exhibit.

Animals of the Chihuahuan Desert 
The Animals of the Chihuahuan Desert section contains exhibits of a variety of animals from the Chihuahuan Desert to include, Mexican gray wolves, prairie dogs, Peninsular pronghorn, white-nosed coati, collared peccary, mountain lions, jaguars, wild turkeys, and parrots. Along with a small mix area to include birds and reptiles.

Master plan

Entry and events

Conservation 

In November 2010, the zoo sent a female Mexican gray wolf to Tenino, Washington, to be bred with a male wolf. The wolves were selected by a panel of experts as part of an effort to save the species from extinction. It is estimated that there are only 40 Mexican grey wolves left in the wild.

Zoo directors

Joe Montisano 
 2019 - present

Steve Marshall  
 2007–2019

Steve Marshall was the director of the El Paso Zoo from 2007 to 2019. He was the chief operating officer of Zoo Atlanta for nine years. He was responsible for overseeing major zoo functions including the zoo's animal collection, human resources, education, construction, maintenance and horticulture, guest services, and special projects at Zoo Atlanta. Before that, he was executive director of The Parks at Chehaw in Albany, Georgia, and was also the director of interpretation at the Texas State Aquarium in Corpus Christi and curator of education at the Birmingham (Alabama) Zoo.  He earned an MS in biology and animal behavior from Texas A&M University-Commerce and a BS in biology from the University of Tennessee.

Lea Hutchinson 
 1987-1997, 2004-2006 (interim), 2008–present (emeritus)
 
Dr. Lea Hutchinson, VMD, MS, became the El Paso Zoo's veterinarian in 1965. He graduated from the University of Pennsylvania in 1957. He was the veterinarian until 1987, when he was hired as the El Paso Zoo director.

During Dr. Hutchinson's first tenure as director, he "improved and expanded the animal collection to include species from the American and Asian continents." He also oversaw the zoo's re-accreditation by the American Zoo and Aquarium Association (AZA) and the zoo's participation in the Species Survival Plan (SSP) for a number of endangered species. "Major projects completed during Dr. Hutchinson's tenure included the Asian expansion, American Aviary, the history-based 'Paraje' and many new or renovated exhibits."

Dr. Hutchinson served as the zoo director until 1997, and came out of retirement to be the interim director from 2004 to 2006. In 2008, Dr. Hutchinson also became the El Paso Zoo's first honorary director emeritus. This honorary title is intended to recognize meritorious, outstanding, and dedicated service of a former director of an organization. As director emeritus, Dr. Hutchinson oversaw the construction of the African Savannah exhibit, completed in 2012, which includes lions, zebras, and giraffes.

Gallery

References

External links 
 

Zoos in Texas
Culture of El Paso, Texas
Tourist attractions in El Paso, Texas
Zoos established in 1930